, also known as Prince Hisaakira, was the 8th shōgun of the Kamakura shogunate of Japan.

He was the nominal ruler controlled by Hōjō clan regents. He was the father of his successor, Prince Morikuni.

Prince Hisaaki was the son of Emperor Go-Fukakusa and the younger brother of Emperor Fushimi.

Family
 Father: Emperor Go-Fukakusa
 Mother: Fujiwara no Fusako
 Adopted Father: Prince Koreyasu
 Wife: daughter of Prince Koreyasu (d. 1306)
 Concubine: Reizei no Tsubone
 Children:
 Prince Morikuni by daughter of Prince Koreyasu
 Prince Hisayoshi (1310–1347) by Reizei no Tsubone
 Prince Hiroaki (d. 1348)
 Prince Kiyozumi

Eras of Hisaaki's bakufu
The years in which Hisaaki is shogun are more specifically identified by more than one era name or nengō.
 Shōō (1288–1293)
 Einin (1293–1299)
 Shōan (1299–1302)
 Kengen (1302–1303)
 Kagen (1303–1306)
 Tokuji (1306–1308)
 Enkyō (1308–1311)

Notes

References
 Nussbaum, Louis-Frédéric and Käthe Roth. (2005).  Japan encyclopedia. Cambridge: Harvard University Press. ;  OCLC 58053128
 Titsingh, Isaac. (1834). Nihon Ōdai Ichiran; ou,  Annales des empereurs du Japon. Paris: Royal Asiatic Society, Oriental Translation Fund of Great Britain and Ireland. OCLC 5850691.

1276 births
1328 deaths
13th-century Japanese people
14th-century Japanese people
13th-century shōguns
14th-century shōguns
Japanese princes
Kamakura shōguns
Sons of emperors
People from Kyoto